The 1907–08 season was the fifth competitive season in the history of Plymouth Argyle Football Club.

References
General

Specific

External links
Plymouth Argyle F.C. official website
Plymouth Argyle F.C. archive

1907-08
English football clubs 1907–08 season